Affluence is the abundance of valuable resources or valuable material possessions.

Affluence may also refer to:
 Affluence Garden, a public housing estate in Tuen Mun, Hong Kong
 Affluence stop, an MTR Light Rail stop adjacent to the estate

See also 
 Affluent (disambiguation)
 Affluenza, a portmanteau of affluence and influenza used by critics of consumerism